The deputy governor of Lagos State is the second-highest officer in the executive branch of the government of Lagos State, after the governor of Lagos State, and ranks first in line of succession. The deputy governor is directly elected together with the governor to a four-year term of office.

Femi Hamzat is the current deputy governor of Lagos State, he assumed office on 29 May 2019.

Qualifications
As in the case of the Governor, in order to be qualified to be elected as Deputy Governor, a person must:
be at least thirty-five (35) years of age;
be a Nigerian citizen by birth;
be a member of a political party with endorsement by that political party;
have School Certificate or its equivalent.

Responsibilities
The Deputy Governor assists the Governor in exercising primary assignments and is also eligible to replace a dead, impeached, absent or ill Governor as required by the 1999 Constitution of Nigeria.

List of Deputy Governors

See also
Governor of Lagos State
Government of Lagos State

References

Deputy Governors of Lagos State
Executive Council of Lagos State